The Al Taqwa Mosque is a mosque in Taman Tun Dr Ismail, Kuala Lumpur, Malaysia.

See also
 Islam in Malaysia
 GoogleMaps StreetView of Masjid At-Taqwa, Kuala Lumpur

References

Mosques in Kuala Lumpur